In enzymology, a xyloglucan 6-xylosyltransferase is an enzyme that catalyzes the chemical reaction in which an alpha-D-xylosyl residue is transferred from UDP-D-xylose to a glucose residue in xyloglucan, being attached by an alpha-1,6-D-xylosyl-D-glucose bond.

This enzyme belongs to the family of glycosyltransferases, specifically the pentosyltransferases.  The systematic name of this enzyme class is UDP-D-xylose:xyloglucan 1,6-alpha-D-xylosyltransferase. Other names in common use include uridine diphosphoxylose-xyloglucan 6alpha-xylosyltransferase, and xyloglucan 6-alpha-D-xylosyltransferase.

References

 
 

EC 2.4.2
Enzymes of unknown structure